The Vermont Department of Libraries Is the official state library agency of Vermont located in Barre, Vermont. It is a department under Vermont's Agency of Administration.

History
The State Library came into existence in 1825 when Robert Pierpoint a member of the Council of Censors introduced a resolution for the state to appoint a person to take care of the state's collection of books and public documents. The library was originally only for public documents, legal books and publications for the Supreme Court and legislature. In 1854 the State Librarian received a $200 appropriation to buy books of his choosing.

Until 1969 the state had two library agencies: the State Library, and the Free Public Library Service which ran a series of regional libraries and a bookmobile service. The two units were merged into the Department of Libraries on March 31,1970. The State Librarian is appointed by the Governor. The State Librarian is advised by a Board of Libraries, the seven members of which are also appointed by the Governor.

Building
The State Library was originally housed inside the Vermont State House. In 1857 the State House burned and the items remaining at the State Library were relocated to a private home before moving back in to the rebuilt State House, and then to its own building. The State Library building was built in 1918 and was located at 111 State St in Montpelier Vermont in a space it shared with the state Supreme Court. The 1927 Flood destroyed nearly 50,000 documents belonging to the State Library. The library later moved next door to 109 State Street (the Pavilion), and in 2018 relocated to Barre, Vermont at the site of the old Spaulding school building in a space it shares with the Vermont Historical Society.

State Librarians

References

External links
Official website

State libraries of the United States
Department of Libraries